A certificate of authenticity (COA) is a seal or small sticker on a proprietary computer program, t-shirt, jersey, or any other memorabilia or art work, especially in the world of computers and sports. It is commonly a seal on paper authenticating a specific art work which and is made to demonstrate that the item is authentic.

COAs for software 
Computer COAs have a license number on them, which verifies that the program is a genuine, legal copy. Artwork or posters come with a certificate of authenticity signed and sealed by a reputable appraiser or auction house.

COAs for art 
COAs are mostly common in the art world. Generally speaking, a valid COA for an artwork will include specific details about the artwork like when and how it was produced, the names of people or companies involved in the artwork's production, the work's exact title, the dimensions of the art, and the names of reference books, magazines, or similar resources that contain either specific or related information about either that work of art or the artist. The COA should also state the qualifications and full contact information of the individual or entity that authored the certificate with his or her complete and current contact information. COAs have been a target of much controversy due to online auction sites where sellers are providing fake Certificates of Authenticity to market or sell their art works.

COAs in auctions 
COA's are commonly used on internet auction sites in order to provide "proof" that the signature on a signed item is genuine. However, it is widely acknowledged that most of these COA's have simply been produced by fraudulent sellers in order to encourage the buyer to buy fake items. In almost all cases these COA's are worthless and have no traceability. It has been shown that around 90% of the COA's issued by these sellers do not even have the contact details of the person selling the item, or if they do they are often incorrect or have an address of a company that has long since disappeared.

Legals aspect of COAs

United Kingdom 
Any COA is of no value at all unless it has the full contact details of the issuer. In the United Kingdom, it is an offense under the Fraud Act 2006 (section 7) to create or use a COA in the sale of an autograph or similar item: A person is guilty of an offense if he makes, adapts, supplies or offers to supply any article—

a) knowing that it is designed or adapted for use in the course of or in connection with fraud, or

b) intending it to be used to commit, or assist in the commission of, fraud.

In other words, if the seller is offering fakes with a COA, then he/she is committing more than one offense, and the offense of issuing a COA alone is a possible 12-month prison sentence.

See also
 Digital certificates

References

External links

 Certificates of Authenticity, Explained, by Brooke Oliver, Esq.

Ephemera
Software licenses